The 1932 World Table Tennis Championships women's singles was the sixth edition of the women's singles championship.
Anna Sipos defeated Mária Mednyánszky in the final by three sets to nil, to win the title.

Draw

Finals

See also
List of World Table Tennis Championships medalists

References

-
-